The Koninklijke School voor Onderofficieren (Dutch) or École Royale des Sous-Officiers (French) is the main military training establishment in Belgium for non-officer staff of the Belgian armed forces.

History
The site opened in 1946 as the École Royale Technique de la Force Aérienne, the main technical training school for the Belgian Air Force (founded during the Second World War at Snailwell in England). A fire in 1948 led to a temporary relocation to Tongeren while new buildings were constructed, with further works required in the late 1960s, when the campus took on its current structure.

In 2007-8 the site was widened from the Belgian Air Force to the Belgian Armed Forces.

Structure
It is situated in the east of Belgium, in the northern Dutch-speaking half of the country, in Limburg.

The site is run by the Belgian Armed Forces (Defensie van België).

Training
It offers technical training.

See also
 Royal Military Academy (Belgium), for officers

References

External links
 

Buildings and structures in Limburg (Belgium)
Colleges in Belgium
Military education and training in Belgium